is a railway station in Miyazaki City, Miyazaki Prefecture, Japan.

Lines

Layout 
The station consists of a side and an island platform serving three tracks at grade. Track/platform 1, directly access from the station building, is a dead-end siding that only serves trains heading to/from the direction of Miyazaki to the south. The island platform with tracks 2 and 3 is accessed by a footbridge. A passing loop runs between tracks 1 and 2. The station building is a modern flat-roofed concrete structure which houses a waiting area, a staffed ticket window, an automatic ticket vending machine, and SUGOCA card reader and charge machine. Adjacent to the station building and beside track 1 is a container terminer, formerly served by rail but now part of the Sadowara ORS (off-rail station) which only uses trucks.

Management of the passenger facilities at the station has been outsourced to the JR Kyushu Tetsudou Eigyou Co., a wholly owned subsidiary of JR Kyushu specialising in station services. It staffs the ticket booth which is equipped with a POS machine but does not have a Midori no Madoguchi facility.

Adjacent stations

History
In 1913, the  had opened a line from  northwards to Hirose and by 1914, to Tsuma. After the Miyazaki Prefectural Railway was nationalized on 21 September 1917, Japanese Government Railways (JGR) undertook the subsequent extension of the track. In the first phase of expansion, the track was forked northwest and north. This new stretch and the rest of the track south to  Miyazaki became part of the Miyazaki Main Line. On the same day, Hirose on the Tsuma Line track was closed and this station was opened at the junction of the Tsuma and Miyazaki Main Line. It took on the name Hirose but was renamed Sadowara on 1 July 1965. Expanding north from Takanabe in phases and joining up with other networks, the track eventually reached  and the entire stretch from Kokura through Hirose to Miyakonojō was redesignated as the Nippō Main Line on 15 December 1923. On 1 December 1984, the Tsuma Line was closed, leaving the Nippō Main Line as the only line to serve Sadowara. With the privatization of Japanese National Railways (JNR), the successor of JGR, on 1 April 1987, the station came under the control of JR Kyushu.

Passenger statistics
In fiscal 2016, the station was used by an average of 1,075 passengers daily (boarding passengers only), and it ranked 155th among the busiest stations of JR Kyushu.

See also
List of railway stations in Japan

References

External links

Sadowara (JR Kyushu)

Railway stations in Miyazaki Prefecture
Railway stations in Japan opened in 1920